Certified in Financial Forensics (CFF) is a specialty credential in financial forensics issued by the American Institute of Certified Public Accountants (AICPA).

History
The CFF credential was established in 2008 to designate expertise in forensic accounting.

Objectives of credentialing
The program objectives include: (i) enhancing the quality of forensic services and (ii) increasing public awareness of the CFF designation.

Fundamental forensic knowledge
A. Laws, Courts and Dispute Resolution
Basic Civil and Criminal Laws and Dispute Resolution
Basic Federal and State Rules of Evidence
Basic Federal and State Rules of Procedure
Federal Courts
State Courts
Other laws, regulations and guidance
Other agencies

B. Planning and Preparation
Accepting the Engagement
Understanding with Client
Initial meeting with Client’s Attorney
Determine required personnel and resources

C. Information Gathering and Preserving
Document and Evidence Gathering
Document and Evidence Preservation and Retention
Interviewing

D. Discovery
Requesting and examining other parties’ information
Assist in making client’s information available
Make forensic accountant’s own information available

E. Reporting, Experts and Testimony
Testifying forensic accountant needs to supervise and control
Preparation of report and exhibits
Fact finding
Reports
Experts
Non‐expert testimony

Specialized forensic knowledge
A. Bankruptcy, insolvency and reorganization
Roles and responsibilities
Reporting Requirements
Bankruptcy valuation issues
Understanding of insolvency
Basic reorganization concepts

B. Valuation
Interests in Business Entities, Pensions, Intangible property, Intellectual property, Interests in Estates and trusts, and others
Purpose
Engagement Considerations: Standards of Value, Premises of Value, Approaches, Methods

C. Economic damage calculations
Economic damages ‐ businesses: Lost profits, Lost value, Extra costs, Lost cash flow, Mitigation, Restitution, Interest/time value of money, Out of pocket, Rescission, Unjust enrichment, Determination of Present Value date of damages, Methods of determining
Economic damages ‐ individuals: Lost earnings, Medical expenses, Burial costs, Lost household services, Cost of repairing or replacing property, Cost of loss of use of property, Interest/time value of money
Intellectual property: Patents, Copyrights, Trademarks/Trade names, Trade Secrets
Punitive Damages

D. Family Law
Asset valuation
Asset tracing
Income determination
Collaborative law
Child Support
Alimony
Tax planning re distribution of assets

E. Financial Statement Misrepresentations
Fraud
Financial Statement Misstatements
Asset Misappropriation
Foreign Corrupt Practices Act Investigations

F. Fraud prevention, detection and response
Fraud Risk Governance
Fraud Risk Assessment
Fraud Prevention
Fraud Detection
Fraud Investigation
Reporting
Remediation

G. Computer forensic analysis
Data integrity: Data imaging, Data recovery
Cyber crime

Eligibility

To obtain the CFF credential, the applicant must:

Hold a Certified Public Accountant (CPA) license;
Pass the CFF examination;
Demonstrate in excess of 1,000 hours of experience doing forensic accounting work;
Complete 75 hours of continuing professional education (CPE) related to forensic accounting.

After obtaining the CFF credential, the CPA must continue to earn at least 20 hours of financial forensics-related CPE per year to maintain the CFF credential.

References

External links
Association of Certified Fraud Examiners
Certified in Financial Forensics

Accounting qualifications